Gerry Casey (25 August 1941 — 24 June 2019) was an English footballer, who played as a midfielder in the Football League for Tranmere Rovers.

He is best remembered as one of the Football League's hardest players. He was dismissed for violent conduct in a match against Torquay United in August 1967, just a few minutes into his league debut. This made Casey the first ever player to be sent off on his debut in the Football League.

References

External links

Tranmere Rovers F.C. players
Ellesmere Port Town F.C. players
English Football League players
Association football midfielders
1941 births
2019 deaths
People from Birkenhead
English footballers